The White Out is a tradition at the Pennsylvania State University during select Nittany Lions home football games, where all spectators come dressed in white. It has been described as "the best atmosphere in college football." It is also among the most expensive regular season games of college football, with ticket prices ranging upwards of $250. All White Out games are showcased with an advanced fireworks display lining the east and west (long ends) of Beaver Stadium. During these games, Zombie Nation's Kernkraft 400 replaces Fight On, State as the fight song after Penn State scores.

Michigan has appeared in the most White Out games, currently sitting at six. Ohio State has appeared in the second most with five. Seven other teams have each made a single appearance, of which only three were not members of the Big Ten Conference. The White Out is the football program’s premier home event, and as such, it frequently touts some of Penn State’s biggest rivalries, non-conference opponents, and highly rated recruiting opportunities.

Background
In 2002, leading up to a much hyped up game against Nebraska, there was a fear that a "Sea of Red" would overtake the stands in Beaver Stadium. An email began to be circulated amongst Penn State fans to both wear blue to the game and not to sell their tickets to Cornhusker fans. Dubbed "Operation Visine" (to "get the red out"), this precursor to the modern White Out worked, as there was not only record attendance, most of whom were Penn State fans, but the Nittany Lions upset #7 Nebraska 40–7.

In 2004, to try and draw extra excitement for the team in what was a down year for the program, the Penn State Athletic Department asked students to wear white to the upcoming game against Purdue. Over 20,000 students participated and, despite losing the game, it was deemed a success. Students were again asked to wear white to the following game against Iowa in what is considered to be one of the program's worst outings. While the "wear white" participation was about the same as it was in the previous game, the crushing 6–4 loss resulted in a drop in popularity of the event. A final attempt was made for the final game of the season against Michigan State. This time, however, the Athletic Department decided to change strategy with a "Code Blue" dress code and extended it to all fans in the stadium. Students were sent from dorm to dorm to spread the word to maximize participation. Penn State would win 37–13 thanks to a 28-point third quarter off the back of a plethora of Spartan interceptions. However, despite finally getting a win, the Code Blue tradition did not stick and students went back to wearing white the following season. Even though the 2004 season had three games with dress codes, only the game against Purdue is counted as an official White Out. 

The White Out would be cemented in 2005 with an upset win over rival Ohio State. The crowd was the second largest in Beaver Stadium history at the time, which many believe helped Penn State win.

For the 2007 game against Notre Dame, the all-white dress code would be officially extended to all spectators, not just the student section. This was the first of only three White Outs to feature a non-conference opponent, with the others being Alabama in 2011 and Auburn in 2021. From 2012 to 2019, the game alternated between Ohio State and Michigan.

The Penn State Bookstore began selling official White Out shirts for the 2008 game, a tradition that holds to this day. The shirts are designed and chosen by students.

The 2013 and 2014 editions featured the only two White Outs to go to overtime. In 2013, Penn State upset 18th-ranked Michigan, 43–40. The Nittany Lions tied the game after a touchdown with only 27 seconds remaining, and the Wolverines missed a field goal short on the ensuing drive to end regulation. After both missing field goals in the first overtime and a matching pair in the second, Penn State fumbled the ball on the first play of the third. However, Michigan missed a potential game winning field goal on the following drive. The Wolverines opened the fourth overtime with a field goal, putting the pressure on the Nittany Lions. After a defensive pass interference call in the endzone, the ball was placed on the one-yard line. Penn State ran the ball for a touchdown on the next play to finish the game, making it the longest in Big Ten history. In 2014, Penn State lost to 12th-ranked Ohio State in double overtime, 31–24. Despite being predicted to get blown out prior to kickoff, the Nittany Lions played a tough, close game and led the Buckeyes at various points. The loss is controversial, though, as many college football observers thought it was marred by questionable officiating, specifically citing two missed calls. 

Perhaps the most influential White Out was Penn State's 24–21 upset win over No. 2 Ohio State in 2016, which is regarded by many as the best game in Penn State football history. The pivotal play, Grant Haley's blocked field goal return in the 4th quarter, was voted as the best Penn State play of the century. The game's aftermath included fans storming the field at Beaver Stadium and celebratory riots in downtown State College. Their White Out rematch two years later, a 27–26 loss, would break the Beaver Stadium attendance record, edging out the previous record (the 2017 White Out against Michigan, a 42–13 victory) by less than 70 attendees.

The 2020 White Out was originally scheduled for October 24 against Ohio State. The game was rescheduled to October 31 when the Big Ten announced its updated conference-only schedule due to the COVID-19 pandemic. On August 6, Penn State announced that the Nittany Lions' season would begin with no fans in attendance at Beaver Stadium, casting doubt on the possibility of a White Out game in 2020. Fans ultimately were not allowed to attend any games, leading to the annual tradition being canceled for the first time since its inception. Despite the cancellation, the official 2020 White Out shirt was still sold by the Penn State Bookstore, making it a unique, novelty item of memorabilia.

The 2021 White Out game was against Auburn but a variation of the White Out involving a blue helmet stripe was used against Michigan, the Nittany Lions would lose that game 21-17.

ESPN College Gameday has attended six White Out games since the inception of the tradition. 2005 marked their first White Out visit, followed by the 2009 loss to Iowa. The show had been at every White Out between 2017 and 2019, and were among the first to try the Penn State Creamery's new "White Out" ice cream.

Penn State has only faced an unranked opponent in the White Out four times since its inception. These include Notre Dame in 2007, Iowa in 2009, Michigan in 2010, and Minnesota in 2022.

Results

Source:

References

Pennsylvania State University